Hermenegildo B. Reyes, KGCR (March 31, 1898 – 1982)  co-founded the University of the East, was a Boy Scouts of the Philippines Scouting notable, Filipino educator, lawyer, mechnical and electrical engineer. Reyes served on the World Scout Committee of the World Organization of the Scout Movement from 1961 to 1967.

Early life 
Reyes was born in Malolos, Bulacan, to Vicente Tantoco Reyes and his wife, Olympia San Agustin-Reyes.

Education 
Reyes graduated from Ateneo de Manila University magna cum laude with a Bachelor of Arts in 1914. He earned his Ll.B from the University of the Philippines in Manila; thereafter being admitted to Integrated Bar of the Philippines on November 18, 1935. He graducated in Mechanical Engineering with a certificate in Electrical Engineering in 1918 and graduated with a Master of Mechanical Engineering from Cornell University, New York in 1919. Reyes was a junior member of the American Society of Mechanical Engineers (ASME) and a member of the American Institute of Electrical Engineers (AIEE).  Reyes was a member of the Cornell chapters of Tau Veta Pi engineering honour society, Eta Kappa Nu honour society of the Institute of Electrical and Electronics Engineers (IEEE) and Sigma Xi The Scientific Research Honor Society.

From 1947 to 1949, Reyes was President of the UP Alumni Engineers Association.

Career 
In 1918, Reyes was appointed Assistant Professor of Mechanical and Electrical Engineering Department. In 1919, Reyes was a tester for General Electric Co. From 1919 to 1920, he was an assistant electrical designer at The Philadelphia Electric Company. From 1920 to 1921, Reyes was an assistant mechanic and electronic designing engineer ath the Bureau of Public Works. In 1934, Reyes was a member of National Research Council of the Philippine Islands. In 1939, Reyes was Chairman of the Division of Engineering and Industrial Research for the National Research Council of the Philippines and was based in  Malate, Manila.

Reyes served as the Far Eastern University's second University President from 1945 to 1946 when it re-opened after the Pacific War. In 1951, he co-founded the University of the East and served as one of its Board Members.

From 1955 to 1956, Reyes was a member of the Executive Committee of the Second National Eucharistic Congress of the Philippines which was held in 1956, in Manila, from 28 November to 2 December. Reyes and fellow electrical engineer and acting Chief Scout and President Don Gabriel Daza were in charge of planning the event. As electrical engineers Reyes and Daza also managed the lighting and P.A. system for the event.

In 1969, he served as the chairman of the Board of Trustees of the Central Colleges of the Philippines.

Aside from the academe, Reyes was involved with national institutions. In 1952, President Quirino appointed Reyes Vice President of the Manila Electric Company (MERALCO). In 1955, Reyes was a member of both the Economic Planning Board and National Power Board under President Magsaysay.

Reyes was also a Trustee of the Knights of Columbus Fraternal Association of the Philippines Inc.

Personal life 
Reyes married Pacita "Paz" T. Adriano on November 2, 1920, in Manila. They had a daughter named Rosario.

Death 
Reyes died in 1982.

Awards 
:

  Supreme Commander and Knight Grand Cross of the Order of the Knights of Rizal.

Boy Scouts:

 Bronze Wolf awarded by the World Scout Conference in1967.

Legacy

Central Colleges of the Philippines Hermenegildo R. Reyes Campus 
The main Central Colleges of the Philippines (CCP) campus is named after Reyes.The campus also has a Dr. Hermenegildo R. Reyes (HR) Hall which houses, among others, the President's Office and College of Computer Studies and Architecture.

References

Recipients of the Bronze Wolf Award
Scouting in the Philippines
World Scout Committee members
Ateneo de Manila University alumni
Academic staff of the University of the Philippines Diliman
Cornell University alumni
University of the Philippines Manila alumni
Filipino engineers